Connie Lawson (born April 20, 1949) is an American politician. A Republican, Lawson was Indiana Secretary of State from 2012 to 2022 and was a member of the Indiana Senate from 1996 to 2012. While in the state senate, she was Republican floor leader.

Early life, education, and career
Lawson was born and raised in Danville, located in Hendricks County in central Indiana.  She graduated from Danville High School. She attended Darden School of Legislative Leadership and in 1998 she went to Bowhay Institute for Legislative Leadership. Lawson was elected Clerk of the Hendricks County Circuit Court in 1988. She was subsequently reelected twice to four-year terms  As clerk, her responsibilities included maintaining all records of the court and overseeing elections.  During this period, Lawson was also president of the Indiana Clerks’ Association and chair of the group’s legislative committee. She also served as Vice Chair of the Hendricks County Republican Party from 1995 to 2005.

State Senate
Lawson was a member of the Indiana Senate from 1996 to 2012. She replaced incumbent State Senator Richard Thompson. She was the first woman appointed to the post of Indiana Senate Majority Floor Leader.  The American Conservative Union gave her an Indiana Legislature evaluation of 93%.

Indiana State Senate 24th District Election Results, November 2, 2004

Indiana State Senate 24th District Republican Primary Election Results, May 6, 2008

Indiana State Senate 24th District Election Results, November 4, 2008

Secretary of State
On March 16, 2012, Governor Mitch Daniels appointed Lawson Secretary of State.

Indiana Secretary of State Election Results, November 4, 2014

In the summer of 2018, Lawson received two challenges to her eligibility as Candidate for Secretary of State of Indiana. The challenges stemmed from the Indiana Constitution's provision that states no person shall be eligible for "more than eight years in any period of twelve years." Both eligibility claims were dismissed, but questions still exist over her ability to finish the entire term if re-elected in 2018. She was reelected.

In 2016, Lawson targeted a voter registration group, the Indiana Voter Registration Project, who she claimed were "nefarious actors" and who were engaging in turning in "forged voter registration applications." Shortly thereafter, police raided the organization's building. There is no evidence that the group was turning in forged voter registration applications.

On February 15, 2021, Lawson announced that she intended to resign to focus on her health and family. She formally resigned after Indiana Governor Eric Holcomb selected state Rep. Holli Sullivan as Lawson's successor.

Personal life
Connie Lawson is married to Jack Lawson, has two children Brandon and Kylie, and seven grandchildren. She and her husband own and operate Lawson & Company, an auctioneer and real estate business.

References

External links
Connie Lawson at Ballotpedia
Our Campaigns – Connie Lawson (IN) profile
 Official Indiana Secretary of State website
 
 

|-

1949 births
Living people
21st-century American politicians
21st-century American women politicians
Republican Party Indiana state senators
People from Danville, Indiana
Politicians from Indianapolis
Secretaries of State of Indiana
Women state legislators in Indiana